Robert Bonney (1884 – 6 May 1951) was a British gymnast. He competed in the men's team event at the 1908 Summer Olympics. Bonney moved to Canada in 1914, and became the President of the gym club at the Central YMCA in Toronto.

References

External links
 

1884 births
1951 deaths
British male artistic gymnasts
Olympic gymnasts of Great Britain
Gymnasts at the 1908 Summer Olympics
Place of birth missing